Diogo António José Leite Pereira de Melo e Alvim was a former Portuguese colonial Governor of Portuguese Guinea (modern Guinea-Bissau) from 1954 to 1956.

References 

Governors of Portuguese Guinea
Year of birth missing
Year of death missing